Moianès is a comarca in the centre of Catalonia, Spain. It became a comarca in May 2015, following approval in a local referendum and by the Parliament of Catalonia. Its 10 municipalities were in the comarques of Bages, Osona, and Vallès Oriental. It had previously been recommended in 2000 in the "Report on the revision of Catalonia's territorial organisation model", known as the "Roca Report", commissioned by the Catalan government.

Even before it was given legal status, Moianès was considered a "natural comarca"—a distinct geographic region—comprising the eponymous Moianès Plateau.

Municipalities

References

External links
  
 Unofficial comarcal website 

 
Comarques of the Province of Barcelona